WLRD (96.9 FM) is a radio station  broadcasting a Southern Gospel format. Licensed to Willard, Ohio, United States, the station serves the Mid-Ohio area.  The station is currently owned by Christian Faith Broadcast, Inc.

History
The station went on the air as WHHA on 1998-11-02.  on 1998-12-28, the station changed its call sign to the current WLRD.

References

External links

Southern Gospel radio stations in the United States
LRD